Pleasant Valley Township is a township in Scott County, Iowa, United States.

Geography
Forest Grove School No. 5 and the Roswell Spencer House are listed on the National Register of Historic Places and located in the township.

Education
Pleasant Valley Township is served by the Pleasant Valley Community School District, including Pleasant Valley High School.

Recreation
Smith's Island Recreation Area, operated by the U.S. Army Corps of Engineers, offers fishing and viewing of local wildlife.

References

Townships in Scott County, Iowa
Cities in the Quad Cities
Townships in Iowa